Charles Ogilvie  (c. 1731–1788) was a Scottish plantation owner, merchant and politician who sat in the British House of Commons in 1774 and 1775.

Early life
Ogilvie was the fourth son of James Ogilvie of Auchiries, Aberdeen and his wife  Margaret Strachan. He emigrated to South Carolina and by 1755 he was a member of the import/export  firm, Ogilvie and Ward at Charleston. He married  Mary Michie, daughter of James Michie, chief justice of South Carolina in about 1760.  By marriage and purchase he acquired plantations which produced mainly rice but also indigo. Ogilvie became friendly with Alexander Garden, a Scottish botanist in Charles Town. In 1761 Ogilvie  returned to Britain to manage the London end of a new firm of Charles Ogilvie and John Forbes. He had letters of introduction from Garden, and was to act as his agent, while Garden would look after his estates in South Carolina. In 1774 Ogilvie took his nephew George Ogilvie to South Carolina’ Carolina. He then left Carolina for England late June 1774 leaving his nephew George to look after the business in Carolina. George was supported by Garden and eventually acquired his own estates.

Political career
Ogilvie was returned as  Member of Parliament for West Looe at the 1774 general election. In May 1775 he resigned his seat, possibly because the interruption of trade had affected his financial position.

Later life and legacy
Ogilvie went back to Carolina  after the war in 1784 and petitioned the South Carolina General Assembly for the return of his plantations. The Alexandria Plantation in Beaufort county was eventually returned to his sons, Charles  and John, although 499 acres had already been sold to an American officer whereas the Richfield plantation was eventually fully returned to his sons. Ogilvie himself did not revisit Carolina, although his children settled there. Ogilvie died in 1788 some time before 18 October.

References

1730s births
1788 deaths
British MPs 1774–1780
Members of the Parliament of Great Britain for English constituencies
Scottish slave owners